Bayfront is an unincorporated community and census-designated place (CDP) in Ashland County, Wisconsin, United States. As of the 2020 census, it had a population of 113.

Bayfront is in northern Ashland County, on the southeast shore of Chequamegon Bay, an inlet of Lake Superior. The community is within the limits of the Bad River Reservation.

References 

Populated places in Ashland County, Wisconsin
Census-designated places in Ashland County, Wisconsin
Census-designated places in Wisconsin